The results of the 2014 Little League World Series was determined between August 14 and August 24, 2014 in South Williamsport, Pennsylvania. 16 teams were divided into two groups, one with eight teams from the United States and another with eight international teams, with both groups playing a modified double-elimination tournament. In each group, the last remaining undefeated team faced the last remaining team with one loss, with the winners of those games advancing to play for the Little League World Series championship.

Double-elimination stage

United States

Winner's bracket

Game 2: Illinois 12, Washington 2

Game 4: Nevada 12, South Dakota 2

Game 6: Pennsylvania 4, Tennessee 0

Game 8: Texas 6, Rhode Island 4

Game 14: Nevada 13, Illinois 2

Game 16: Pennsylvania 7, Texas 6

Game 24: Nevada 8, Pennsylvania 1

Loser's bracket

Game 10: Washington 7, South Dakota 5

Game 12: Rhode Island 8, Tennessee 7

Game 18: Texas 11, Washington 4

Game 20: Illinois 8, Rhode Island 7

Game 22: Illinois 6, Texas 1

Game 26: Illinois 6, Pennsylvania 5

International

Winner's bracket

Game 1: South Korea 10, Czech Republic 3

Game 3: Puerto Rico 16, Australia 3

Game 5: Mexico 4, Canada 3

Game 7: Japan 1, Venezuela 0

Game 13: South Korea 8, Puerto Rico 5

Game 15: Japan 9, Mexico 5

Game 23: South Korea 4, Japan 2

Loser's bracket

Game 9: Australia 10, Czech Republic 1

Game 11: Venezuela 10, Canada 0

Game 17: Mexico 6, Australia 2

Game 19: Venezuela 2, Puerto Rico 1

Game 21: Mexico 11, Venezuela 1

Game 25: Japan 12, Mexico 1

Crossover games

Game A: South Dakota 5, Czech Republic 3

Game B: Tennessee 12, Canada 9

Single-elimination stage

International Championship: South Korea 12, Japan 3

United States Championship: Nevada 5, Illinois 7

Consolation Game

World Championship Game

References

External links
Full schedule from littleleague.org 

2014 Little League World Series